Springfield District Court, now the City Hall Annex, is a historic former courthouse at 1600 E. Columbus Avenue in Springfield, Massachusetts.  Built in 1929-30, it is a prominent local example of civic Classical Revival architecture, designed by well-known local architects.  After serving as a county courthouse until the 1970s, it was adapted by the city to house additional municipal offices.  The building was listed on the National Register of Historic Places in 1983.

Description and history
The former Springfield District Court building is located in downtown Springfield, just west of the Municipal Group of institutional buildings where City Hall is located.  It faces east onto East Columbus Avenue, which separates it from that cluster of buildings.  It is a two-story structure, built out of steel and concrete faced in limestone, with Classical Revival styling.  Its main facade is nine bays wide, with the center three projecting slightly and housing the main entrance area.  The entrances are recessed behind two massive columns placed in antis within the recess, and the opening is flanked by pilasters.  The outer bays of the facade have large multi-section windows, separated between floors by decorative metal panels.

The building was constructed beginning in 1929 to replace the previous police court, which was outgrowing its quarters.  The new building served as a district court facility, housing a diversity of court needs for Springfield and surrounding communities.  It was connected to other facilities by a tunnel (through which female prisoners were transported) and by a bridge called the "Bridge of Sighs" because it was where male prisoners were transported.  It continued in that use until the 1970s, when a new courthouse was built at Court Square.  It was then turned over to the city, which has used it for municipal offices since.

See also
National Register of Historic Places listings in Springfield, Massachusetts
National Register of Historic Places listings in Hampden County, Massachusetts

References

Courthouses on the National Register of Historic Places in Massachusetts
Buildings and structures in Springfield, Massachusetts
National Register of Historic Places in Springfield, Massachusetts